Christina Lustenberger (born August 14, 1984 in British Columbia) is a Canadian alpine skier.

Lustenberger has one top-ten finish on the Alpine skiing World Cup circuit, a 10th place in a giant slalom at Ofterschwang in 2006. Lustenberger has also won several giant slalom at the Nor-Am Cup level, and finished 3rd overall in the GS standings in 2006.

Lustenberger competed in the giant slalom at the 2006 Olympics in Turin. She failed to finish the first run.

References

External links
FIS biography

1984 births
Living people
Olympic alpine skiers of Canada
Alpine skiers at the 2006 Winter Olympics
Canadian female alpine skiers